Paul Dutton (born 1943) is a  Canadian poet, novelist, essayist, and oral sound artist.

Early life and career
Dutton was born in Toronto, Ontario, Canada. A member of the legendary Four Horsemen sound poetry quartet (1970–1988), along with Rafael Barreto-Rivera, Steve McCaffery, and the late bpNichol, Dutton joined his soundsinging oralities and harmonica-playing to John Oswald’s alto sax and Michael Snow’s piano and synthesizer in the free-improvisation band CCMC (1989 to the present). He has recently appeared in poetry festivals in Germany, France, and Venezuela, and at music festivals in Canada, the Netherlands, and Argentina. An accomplished writer, in addition to his published books, he has written dozens of published essays on music and writing.

Dutton has collaborated with a wide range of musicians, including fellow oral sound artists Jaap Blonk, Koichi Makigami, Phil Minton, and David Moss in the group Five Men Singing, John Butcher, Bob Ostertag, Phil Durrant, John Russell, Lee Ranaldo, Christian Marclay, Günter Christmann, Thomas Charmetant, Xavier Charles, and Jacques Di Donato. His soundsinging has been called "fascinating, inventive, grippingly obsessive" (The Wire).

"(Five Men Singing) exposes every note, tone, timbre and texture that can be vibrated by the uvula, dredged from the throat and buzzed from the cheeks and lips."

More recently, he formed Quintet à Bras in company with two French poets and two French instrumentalists, and in 2009, Mr. Dutton performed at The Scream In High Park, which is an annual literary festival in Toronto.

Criticism
"The hybridity of Dutton’s æsthetic accomplishments is readily apparent on this CD’s (Mouth Pieces) opening track, Reverberations. Framing the words "gong" and "going" with the use of vowel-generated overtones, Dutton crystallizes form and content in a perfectly balanced musical and literary mantra."
"Whether reading or gurgling, solo Dutton remains compelling."

Awards
bpNichol Chapbook Award, 1989.
Villa Waldberta Scholarship, Cultural Department, City of Munich, 1998
Dora Mavor Moore Award, Toronto Association of Performing Arts, 2007

Anthologies
Best Canadian Essays 1990. (Fifth House Publishers, 1990).
Hard Times: A New Fiction Anthology. (The Mercury Press, 1990).
Carnival. (Insomniac Press, 1996).
The Echoing Years: Contemporary Canadian & Irish Verse (School of Humanities Publications, Waterford Institute of Technology, 2007)
In Fine Form: The Canadian Book of Form Poetry (Polestar, 2005)
Fümms bö wö tää zää Uu: Stimmen und  Klänge der Lautpoesie (Book-CD), (Scholzverlag, 2002)

Books
The Book of Numbers (Porcupine's Quill, 1979).
Right Hemisphere, Left Ear (Coach House Press, 1979).
Visionary Portraits (The Mercury Press, 1991) 
Aurealities (Coach House Books, 1991) 
The Plastic Typewriter (Underwhich Editions, 1993) 
Partial Additives (Writers Forum, c/o Underwhich Editions, 1994) 
Several Women Dancing (The Mercury Press, 2002)

With The Four Horsemen
Horse D'Oeuvres (General Publishing, 1975)
The Prose Tattoo (Membrane Press, 1983)

With Sandra Braman
Spokesheards (Longspoon Press, 1983)

Recordings
Blues, Roots, Legends, Shouts & Hollers (Starborne Productions LP, STB-0180, 1980)
Mouth Pieces (OHM Éditions, 2000) ISBN AVTR 021
Oralizations (Ambiances Magnétiques, 2005) ISBN AM 130

References

External links
Official website 
Five Men Singing 
so'nets 
Coach House Press 
poets.ca 
The Mercury Press 

1943 births
Living people
20th-century Canadian poets
20th-century Canadian male writers
Canadian male poets
21st-century Canadian poets
Canadian male singers
Musicians from Toronto
Writers from Toronto
21st-century Canadian male writers